The 2019 Ligue de Football de Saint Pierre et Miquelon was the 34th season of top-division football in Saint Pierre and Miquelon. Three clubs competed in the league: AS Saint Pierraise, A.S. Miquelonnaise and A.S. Ilienne Amateur. The three teams played each other eight times, composing of a 16-match season starting in May 2019 and ending in September 2019.

Saint Pierraise were the champions.

Clubs

Table

References 

Ligue de Football de Saint Pierre et Miquelon seasons
Saint Pierre and Miquelon
Prem